Nicole Ferroni (born 19 March 1982) is a French comedian, actress, columnist in France Inter  and former biology teacher. She is known for participating in Laurent Ruquier's show On n'demande qu'à en rire.

Selected filmography

References

External links

  
 

1982 births
Living people
French comedians
French humorists
French people of Italian descent
French radio presenters
French women radio presenters
French television actresses
French television presenters
French women television presenters
People from Casablanca
French women comedians
Women humorists